Tamasha is a 1952 Indian Hindi-language romantic comedy film directed by Phani Mazumdar, starring Meena Kumari, Dev Anand and Ashok Kumar. One of the big hits of the year from Bombay Talkies produced by Ashok Kumar and Savak Vacha, "Tamasha" had a narrative far ahead of its times, its action spread over 16 eventful days. This movie is a copy of the Hollywood movie It Started with Eve

A young Meena Kumari with a sparkle in her eyes and an impish smile was quite the opposite of the accomplished tragedienne she became immortalised as. This is the first film of Meena Kumari and Dev Anand and the 2nd film in which Kishore Kumar and Dev Anand acted together. First film of Dev Anand and Kishore Kumar was Ziddi along with Kamini Kaushal.

Storyline
A young heir-apparent, Dilip (Dev Anand) is hopelessly in love with an aspiring film actress, Nayantara (Kaushalya), who together with her scheming mother (Sunalini Devi), a struggling director (Randhir), and an assistant who actually want him to finance her launching pad. The stumbling block is Dilip's ailing grandfather, Rai Saheb (Bipin Gupta) who is dead against the alliance and constantly warning him to break away from the actress that will otherwise only bring shame to the family. Although Dilip keeps assuring him that he has severed all ties, and is, in fact, dating a homely girl from a middle-class family, he is actually besotted with the actress who is simultaneously in an unholy alliance with big star Ashok Kumar (Ashok Kumar). Persuaded by Rai Sahib, Dilip hires the services of Kiran (Meena Kumari) as his new love interest. As Kiran gets more and more comfortable as the housekeeper, Dilip gets caught in the whirlpool of his own creation, drowned in his infatuation with Nayantara and admiration for Kiran.

Cast
Ashok Kumar as Ashok Kumar
Dev Anand as Dilip
Meena Kumari as Kiran
Kishore Kumar as Rajju
Bipin Gupta as Rai Sahib

Film

Soundtrack

References

External links 

 

1952 films
1950s Hindi-language films
Films scored by Khemchand Prakash
Films scored by Manna Dey
Indian romantic comedy films
1952 romantic comedy films
Indian black-and-white films